The Sex Lives of Siamese Twins is the ninth novel by Scottish writer Irvine Welsh, published in May 2014.

Plot summary 

Lucy Brennan is a tough, sadistic, foul-mouthed, bisexual personal trainer. When she’s not finding new ways to insult her clients and hitting Miami’s nightclubs, she diligently tracks her calories with an app called Life map. Lucy leaves a failed romantic evening. She gets caught up in a chase—one gunman and two fleeing homeless victims on the road she finds herself on. In an instant, she reacts and knocks the gunman to the ground, allowing the victims to escape.

She becomes a huge media story when the incident is recorded by Lena Sorenson, an overweight, successful, sculptor who is sorely lacking in self-confidence. Lucy's heroic intervention to stop the murderous assault gets a lot of media attention and unsurprisingly, Sorenson’s video turns Brennan into a media sensation. The story competes for airtime and America’s rapt attention with a story about conjoined twins Anabelle and Amy and the should-they/ shouldn’t-they debate about a risky separation operation so Anabelle can have sex with her boyfriend.

Lucy Brennan is a body-obsessed personal trainer, and Lena Sorenson is a food-obsessed sculptor. They are both fascinated with shape and form and suffer from trauma-induced ruts.

In an exciting twist, it turns out that the two frightened men; Lucy saves from the angry gunman, turned out to be paedophiles. The media focus shifts quickly from the heroine to whether she should have stopped a victim of sexual abuse from taking his revenge.

We find this all out just as Lucy and Lena are getting closer, the latter having hired the former as her trainer. What initially appears to be a one-way relationship bordering on stalking, Lena to Lucy, turns out to be much more. Lena gradually becomes Lucy's obsession, and more specifically Lucy's obsession with removing the fat from Lena's body.

When Lena keeps sneaking key lime pies, Lucy's behavior turns abusive while her interest in Lena turns perversely sexual. Lena is finally drugged and imprisoned in an abandoned apartment complex after she runs out of patience. Lena finally manages to lose weight thanks to her captor's blueberry and protein shake diet, which leaves her alone in her home gym and treadmill. Despite being cuffed to a pillar and urinating into a bucket, she still looks amazing.

Just as America becomes obsessed with the sex lives of the twins, Lucy and Lena become increasingly intertwined with one another’s lives- what starts as a seemingly innocuous. However, this curious friendship soon explodes into an intensely sadomasochistic tango, which leads to kidnapping, commando-regulated diets and murder.

Reception 
Similarities have been drawn between this book and Welsh's first novel, Trainspotting. Elena Seymenliyska of The Daily Telegraph wrote, "It's a bit like his debut, Trainspotting (1993), only instead of the tenements of Leith, we're in the condos of Miami Beach. And in place of heroin addicts, alcoholics and violent psychos, here we have fitness instructors, poseurs – and violent psychos."

The Guardian published a review of the book on 8 May 2014. In the review Sandra Newman takes issue with the lead character: "The pleasure of the book is spoiled by a radically misjudged narrator." Welsh's novel received a much more positive review from David Pollock, published in The Independent on 24 April 2014.

References

External links 
 Book review: The Sex Lives of Siamese Twins by Irvine Welsh – The Scotsman

Novels by Irvine Welsh
Jonathan Cape books
2014 British novels